Aliou Coly (born 10 December 1992) is a Senegalese footballer playing as a defender for Kristiansund in the Eliteserien.

Career

Club

Early career
Aliou Coly started playing football for Casa Sports in Senegal.

In 2012, Coly went on trial with Tippeligaen side Sogndal, where his age was quoted as being 23.

Molde FK
Coly signed for Tippeligaen side Molde in February 2013 at the beginning of the 2013-season.

Coly's first appearance for Molde was in the Norwegian Cup first round match against Elnesvågen in which he scored 4 of the 5 goals in a 5-0 victory. This included a 10-minute hattrick.

In February 2014 Coly joined Kristiansund on loan till 31 July 2014.

Kristiansund
On 21 January 2015, Coly moved to Kristiansund on a permanent deal, signing a two-year contract.

International
Coly made his debut for the Senegalese U-23 team on 17 March 2012.

Career statistics

Club

Honours

Club
Casa Sports
Senegal Premier League (1): 2011/12

Molde
Norwegian Cup (1): 2013

Kristiansund
1. divisjon (1): 2016

References

External links

Molde Profile
Sofoot Profile

1992 births
Living people
Senegalese footballers
Molde FK players
Kristiansund BK players
Eliteserien players
Norwegian First Division players
Senegalese expatriate footballers
Expatriate footballers in Norway
Senegalese expatriate sportspeople in Norway

Association football forwards